Lee Tae-yang (born January 28, 1993, in Cheongju, Chungcheongbuk-do) is a South Korean pitcher who played for the NC Dinos in the Korea Baseball Organization. He bats left-handed and throws right-handed.

Amateur career
Lee attended Cheongju High School. In August 2010 Lee was selected as a member of the South Korean U-18 national team for the 2010 World Junior Baseball Championship held in Edmonton, Alberta, Canada. He made his first appearance of the tournament in the second game of the first round against Canada but left the game in the first inning, giving up two runs without even recording an out. Lee came on in relief in the bottom of the sixth inning of the final game of the first round against Panama and hurled two scoreless innings with three strikeouts en route to a 12–2 victory. Lee appeared in the first game of the 5th–8th placement round against the USA, coming on in relief in the top of the third inning, and threw one scoreless inning striking out Indians' 2011 first-round pick Francisco Lindor.

Notable international appearances

Professional career

Nexen Heroes
In the 2011 KBO Draft, Lee was selected by the Nexen Heroes as the 14th overall pick. For two years with the Heroes, Lee appeared in only nine games in relief, having a 0–1 record and an ERA of 5.19 with one hold.

NC Dinos
Lee was drafted by the expansion NC Dinos in the 2013 KBO Expansion Draft, to be their utility pitcher for 2013.

External links 
Career statistics and player information from Korea Baseball Organization

South Korean baseball players
Kiwoom Heroes players
NC Dinos players
1993 births
Living people
2015 WBSC Premier12 players
Match fixers
People from Cheongju
Sportspeople from North Chungcheong Province